Isidro López may refer to:

 Isidro López (musician) (born 1929), Tejano bandleader Latin American music in the United States
 Isidro Lopez (Tohono O'odham leader), Native American tribal leader and Arizona politician
 Isidro Michel López (1870–1942), Mexican military officer
 Isidro Baldenegro López (c. 1966–2017), Mexican environmental activist, and tribal leader of the Tarahumara